Elisabeth Sarolta von Gutmann (6 January 187528 September 1947) was princess consort of Liechtenstein from 1929 to 1938 as the wife of Prince Franz I of Liechtenstein.

Early life

Elisabeth (also known as Elsa) was born at Vienna, Austria-Hungary. She was the daughter of Wilhelm Isak, Ritter von Gutmann and his second wife Ida. Her father was a Jewish businessman from Moravia. His coal mining and trading company, Gebrüder Gutmann, was in a leading position in the market dominated by the Habsburg monarchy. He and his brother were knighted in 1878 by Emperor Franz Joseph I. They were made knights of the Order of the Iron Crown which simultaneously meant being given a hereditary knighthood. Between 1891 and 1892 he was president of the Vienna Israelite Community.

Marriages

First marriage
In January 1899, she was baptised on the name Elisabeth Sarolta and became a Catholic. A few days later, on 1 February 1899, Elisabeth was married in Vienna to Hungarian Baron Géza Erős of Bethlenfalva (1866–1908). He died on 7 August 1908. They had no children.

Second marriage
In 1914, Elisabeth met Prince Franz of Liechtenstein at the relief fund for soldiers. Prince Franz's brother Prince Johann II did not approve of this relationship. On 11 February 1929, Prince Franz succeeded his brother as Franz I, as his brother had died unmarried and childless. On 22 July 1929, Elisabeth and Franz I married at the small parish church of Lainz near Vienna. They had no children. The couple were the first prince and princess of Liechtenstein to make proper contact with the public through active representation. As princess, Elisabeth participated in official ceremonies, visited institutions and the poor, and became quite popular. She founded Franz und Elsa-Stiftung für die liechtensteinische Jugend, an organisation for teenagers, which still exists. In addition, there was the Princess Elsa Foundation for hospitals. She was, however, identified by local Liechtenstein Nazis as their Jewish "problem". Although Liechtenstein had no official Nazi party, a Nazi sympathy movement had been simmering for years within its National Union party.
In early 1938, just after the annexation of Austria into Greater Nazi Germany, 84-year-old Prince Franz I relinquished decision-making to his 31-year-old grandnephew, who would later succeed him as Prince Franz Joseph II.

Later years

After the death of her husband in 1938, she lived at Semmering Pass, until the annexation of Austria to Nazi Germany, when she went into exile in Switzerland, where she died at Vitznau on Lake Lucerne in 1947.

She was the first princess who was buried not in Vranov, but in the new royal crypt next to the Vaduz Cathedral (previously she was buried near the pilgrimage chapel of Dux in Liechtenstein on 2 October 1947).

Ancestry

Notes and sources 

 Wodianer Family
 Genealogisches Handbuch des Adels, Fürstliche Häuser, Reference: 1968

External links
Elisabeth (Elsa)'s biography on the Princely House's website

|-

1875 births
1947 deaths
19th-century Austrian women
20th-century Austrian women
Princely consorts of Liechtenstein
Austrian baronesses
Austro-Hungarian Jews
Austrian Jews
Austrian people of Czech-Jewish descent
Converts to Roman Catholicism from Judaism
Jewish royalty
Hungarian nobility
Hungarian Jews
Jews and Judaism in Liechtenstein
Nobility from Vienna
20th-century Liechtenstein women
19th-century Liechtenstein women